Potsangbam Renedy Singh, simply known as Renedy Singh (born 20 June 1979), is an Indian football coach, former footballer and football pundit. He was the interim manager of Indian Super League club East Bengal for 2021–22 season. He is also the former captain of the India national football team.

Singh was elected president of the Football Players' Association of India in 2014.

Club career
Singh has previously played for Mohun Bagan, East Bengal Club, EverReady SA and JCT FC. Recently his teammate and friend Sunil Chhetri told the media that Renedy is the best midfielder in the country but also the most under-rated and  unnoticed Indian footballer. Renedy and Sunil Chetri were prominent figures in JCT FC squad, they  helped  JCT FC finish second and third in National Football League 2006-2007 and I-League 2007–08. He has his roots to Sekmai, a well known Football hub.
He is India's very own dead-ball specialist and one of the most experienced members of the 2011 Asian Cup squad.

Like many other current Indian internationals, Renedy is a graduate of the famous Tata Football Academy in Jamshedpur. He spent six years there before signing his first professional contract with East Bengal in 1997. Renedy's performances from midfield with the red and gold brigade earned him his first senior international cap in 98, when he was only 19.

By 2000, Renedy established himself as one of the best freekick takers in the country and was signed by Mohun Bagan. Arguably the best stage of his career was with the Mariners as he played an influential role during their 2001-02 National League triumph. Renedy's ability to cross the ball with both feet made him a mainstay in the India national team, especially after his excellent displays in India's 2002 LG Cup success.

Injuries saw a dip in his form and he incredibly joined Chirag United, then known was Everyday and were not in the top flight, in 2004 after leaving Bagan. However he continued to do well for the Indian team and was actually top scorer in India's dismal 2006 World Cup qualification campaign with two goals. Renedy's club career got revived after he joined JCT in 2005 as he helped the Phagwara-based club finish second in the National League in the 06–07 season.

Renedy joined  East Bengal for the second time in his career in 2008 but was never a regular there because of injuries and lack of match fitness. He did however star in a couple of big Kolkata derbies by providing assists with his superb delivery from set pieces. Renedy has been a key member of the Indian team during Bob Houghton's tenure but since the 2009 Nehru Cup he has not been a regular in the first eleven because of the problems he has had with injury. His best individual moment so far in the Bob Houghton era was without the doubt the delightful curling freekick he scored against Syria in the 2009 Nehru Cup final.

After having a forgettable 2010 season with East Bengal, he was released by the club. He continued to be a regular in the India national football team and showed some skill which made people remember what he is capable of. After representing India in the 2011 AFC Asian Cup, he agreed a contract with Baichung Bhutia's own club United Sikkim FC in the I-League 2nd Division.

On 16 January 2011, Singh had officially signed for Shillong Lajong of the I-League. In 2012, Singh went on to attend trial with Norwegian Eliteserien club Tromsø IL.

On 27 February 2015, he joined Bulgarian side CSKA Sofia on loan from Kerala Blasters, being the first Indian to sign for a Bulgarian club. However, he did not make any official appearances for the team, which was facing serious financial difficulties at the time.

International career
Renedy has been a regular sight in his national team India since 1998, until 2011. He later appeared in the 2002 World Cup Qualifiers, where they defeated teams like United Arab Emirates, Brunei and Yemen. India secured 11 points from 6 matches, same as Yemen, but finished behind them due to an inferior goal difference.

He was a vital part of the Indian team that won the Nehru Cup International Football Tournament 2007 and also the 2008 AFC Challenge Cup. He is good at crossing and his pace making him an integral element of the Indian squad.

While India lost the match, Renedy played a vital role for India against Bahrain in the 2011 Asian Cup setting up both goals scored by India.

Honours

East Bengal
Federation Cup: 1996
IFA Shield: 1997, 2000
Calcutta Football League: 1996, 1998, 1999, 2000

Mohun Bagan
 Sikkim Gold Cup: 2001

JCT Mills
National Football League runner-up: 2006–07

United Sikkim
I-League 2nd Division: 2012

India
AFC Challenge Cup: 2008
SAFF Championship: 2005, 2011; runner-up: 2008; third place: 2003
Nehru Cup: 2007, 2009

India U23
 LG Cup: 2002

Manipur
Santosh Trophy: 2002–03

See also
 List of Indian football players in foreign leagues

References

External links

 http://goal.com/en-india/people/india/21186/renedy-singh

1979 births
Living people
People from Imphal
Meitei people
Footballers from Manipur
Indian footballers
India international footballers
India youth international footballers
East Bengal Club players
2011 AFC Asian Cup players
I-League players
Mohun Bagan AC players
JCT FC players
United Sikkim F.C. players
United SC players
Kerala Blasters FC players
Association football midfielders
Kerala Blasters FC draft picks
Footballers at the 2002 Asian Games
Asian Games competitors for India
Indian expatriate footballers
Indian football coaches
NEROCA FC managers
East Bengal Club managers
Indian football managers